Miss USA 1972 was the 21st Miss USA pageant, held at Cerromar Beach Hotel in Dorado, Puerto Rico, on May 20, 1972. Tanya Wilson of Hawaii was crowned by outgoing titleholder Michele McDonald of Pennsylvania.  This was the second time Hawaii has won the pageant.

Bob Barker (who later that year would begin a 35-year run as host of The Price Is Right on CBS) and singer Helen O'Connell hosted the pageant and the Everly Brothers were the guest entertainers.

Prior to the final competition contestants participated in a number of public appearances, including an official parade held in Ponce and a televised ceremony with Governor Luis Ferre.

This was the first time the pageant was held outside the continental United States.  The event was marred by two bomb blasts at the hotel during the pageant, thought to have been caused by anti-American activists.  There was severe property damage but no injuries were reported.  Earlier that day the venue had been picketed by the Puerto Rican Socialist Party.

Results

Placements

Awards

Historical significance 
 Hawaii wins competition for the second time. 
 New York earns the 1st runner-up position for the third time. The last time it placed this was in 1960.
 California earns the 2nd runner-up position for the first time.
 Florida earns the 3rd runner-up position for the first time.
 Ohio earns the 4th runner-up position for the second time. The last time it placed this was in 1957. Also it reaches the highest placement since Sue Ann Downey won in 1965.
 States that placed in semifinals the previous year were California, District of Columbia, Florida and Michigan.
 California placed for the sixteenth consecutive year.
 Florida placed for the fourth consecutive year. 
 District of Columbia placed for the third consecutive year. 
 Michigan made its second consecutive placement.
 New York, Ohio and South Carolina last placed in 1970.
 Hawaii and New Mexico last placed in 1969.
 Louisiana last placed in 1968.
 Alaska last placed in 1964.
 North Carolina last placed in 1960.
 Texas breaks an ongoing streak of placements since 1969.
 Virginia breaks an ongoing streak of placements since 1967.

Delegates

 Alabama - Elaine Barnhill
 Alaska - Patricia Lane
 Arizona - Marcia Banks
 Arkansas - Susan Tichenor
 California - Kim Hobson
 Colorado - Patricia Cadigan
 Connecticut - Diane Stevens
 Delaware - Michele Voyer
 District of Columbia - Janet Gail Greenawalt
 Florida - Coni Ensor
 Georgia - Kaye Ayers
 Hawaii - Tanya Wilson
 Idaho - Lianne Fulmer
 Illinois - Jani Hall
 Indiana - Julie Clifford
 Iowa - Jennifer Jo Owen
 Kansas - Mona Guesnier
 Kentucky - Tamara Branstetter
 Louisiana - Bonnie Martin
 Maine - Cynthia Luce
 Maryland - Patty Townsend
 Massachusetts - Dale Carder
 Michigan - Marilyn Ann Petty
 Minnesota - Darlene Koskiniemi
 Mississippi - Deborah Pawlik
 Missouri - Janet Potter
 Montana - Mitriann Popovich
 Nebraska - Theresa Engels
 Nevada - Tracey Lynn Whitney
 New Hampshire - Cathy Davis
 New Jersey - Lela Desantes
 New Mexico - Donna Reel
 New York - Alberta Phillips
 North Carolina - Deborah Ann Falls
 North Dakota - Gail Schmeichel
 Ohio - Kathleen Kehlmier
 Oklahoma - Pam Vennerberg
 Oregon - Yvonne Philes
 Pennsylvania - Jeanie Zadrozny
 Rhode Island - Jeanne Lemay
 South Carolina - Susan Gordon
 South Dakota - Kathleen Bakke
 Tennessee - Linda Diane Thompson
 Texas - Susan Peters
 Utah - Peggy Moore
 Vermont - Stacey Becker
 Virginia - Dede Moore
 Washington - Connie Ambrose
 West Virginia - Diane McCutcheon
 Wisconsin - Suzan Nass
 Wyoming - Tamara Tulley

Judges
A panel of ten celebrities was chosen to judge the competition.
Ed Sullivan - entertainer
Walt Frazier - New York Knicks basketball player
Jacqueline Susann - author
Halston - designer
Cindy Adams - broadcaster and columnist
Dong Kingman - artist
Rita Moreno - Puerto Rican actress
Bob Lardine - feature writer for New York Sunday News
Chuck Connors - actor
William Knight - Senior Vice-President for Avis Rent a Car System

See also
Miss Universe 1972

References

1972
1972 in Puerto Rico
1972 beauty pageants
Dorado, Puerto Rico